Donald Lawrence Meade (December 12, 1913 – December 22, 1996) was an American National Champion jockey. Called the "Bad Boy" of the sport by Time magazine because of his numerous suspensions and fines, he is widely know to this day as a result of his win on Brokers Tip in the 1933 Kentucky Derby.

Background
Meade began riding ponies as a child and eventually horses at bush tracks and at county Fair races. In the summer of 1929 he rode horses for the mayor of his hometown who contacted a friend, trainer Sam Orr, who agreed to take Meade on as an apprentice. In July 1930, Meade got his first win aboard Queens Bessie at Lansdowne Park in Richmond, British Columbia.

The "Fighting Finish"
In what became known as the "Fighting Finish", Don Meade on Brokers Tip and jockey Herb Fisher aboard Head Play battled their way to the finish line of the 1933 Kentucky Derby. Head Play was leading when Meade sent Brokers Tip through an opening on the inside to pull even. As the horses ran side by side down the stretch, their jockeys grabbed and whipped each other. The racing stewards declared Brokers Tip the winner by a nose. A photo of the Fighting Finish taken by a photographer for the Louisville Courier-Journal is one of the most widely recognized in Throughbred racing.

Meade died on December 22, 1996, in Hollywood, Florida at age 83.

References

1913 births
1996 deaths
American jockeys
American Champion jockeys
People from Aurora County, South Dakota